Todi is a city in Italy. It may also refer to:

Music
 Todi (thaat), a thaat in Hindustani classical music
 Todi (raga), a raga in Hindustani classical music belonging to the Todi thaat
 Hanumatodi, also known as Todi, a raga in Carnatic music

People
 Ashok Todi (born 1958), Indian industrialist
 Luísa Todi (1753–1833), Portuguese opera singer
 Todi Jónsson (born 1972), Faroese former footballer

Other uses
 Tödi, a mountain massif in the Swiss canton of Glarus
 Todi, Gombe State, Nigeria, a village - see List of villages in Gombe State
 Roman Catholic Diocese of Todi, a former Italian diocese
 A.S.D. Todi, a football club based in Todi, Italy

See also
 Benignus of Todi (died 303), Christian martyr and saint
 Fortunatus of Todi (died 537), Bishop of Todi and saint
 Antonio Valli da Todi, Italian fowler and writer
 Jacopone da Todi (c. 1230–1306), Italian Franciscan friar, song writer and an early pioneer in Italian theatre
 Rogerio da Todi (died 1236), Roman Catholic Franciscan leader